Small Things Like These is an upcoming film adaptation of the book of the same name by Claire Keegan. The film is set to be produced by Alan Moloney and Cillian Murphy, who will also star in the film along with Ciaran Hinds and Emily Watson. It has Tim Mielants directing from an Enda Walsh adapted screenplay.

Synopsis
Leading up to Christmas in 1985, Bill Furlong (Murphy) makes a discovery that makes him confront secrets in his small Irish town.

Cast
 Cillian Murphy as Bill Furlong
 Ciaran Hinds 
 Emily Watson

Production
It was reported in March 2023 that Ben Affleck and Matt Damon would produce via their production company Artists Equity. Damon reportedly producing alongside Drew Vinton and Jeff Robinov, and Affleck executive producing with Kevin Halloran and Michael Joe. Cillian Murphy will appear in the film and produce along with Alan Moloney via their production company Big Things Films. Ciarán Hinds and Emily Watson were announced to be joining Murphy in the cast. The project was revealed to be directed by Tim Mielants, from a script by Enda Walsh.  The film is an Irish production with additional funding coming from Screen Ireland and will be co-produced with Wilder Films in Belgium.

Filming
The Irish Independent reported in late 2022 and early 2023 that shooting locations for a film of the book were being sought in New Ross, County Wexford. Deadline Hollywood reported in March 2023 that principal photography was underway, with filming in County Wicklow expected to last for four weeks.

References

External links

Upcoming films
2020s English-language films
Upcoming English-language films
Films shot in Ireland
Films shot in County Wexford